Tao is a historical Georgian district and part of historic Tao-Klarjeti region, today part of the Eastern Anatolia region of Turkey. Its name derives from the ancient proto-Georgian inhabitants of this area, known as Taochi.

History

Antiquity 
The history of Tao could be traced to the emergence of the tribal confederation of Diauchi (Taochi, Tayk, Taochoi, Tao) at 12–8th century BC. Diauchi was engaged in war with the powerful kingdom of Urartu, and the inscriptions of the Urartu kings Menua ( 810–786 BC) and Argishti ( 786–764) reveal the wealth and power of this kingdom, which was possibly proto-Georgian speaking. In the 8th century BC, Diauchi was destroyed by the neighboring Colchis and Urartu and part of its territory was annexed by the Colchis. In the 4th-3rd centuries BC region was organized into a province of the Iberian Kingdom. 

The region was bitterly contested by the Georgian and Armenian rulers throughout the following centuries. In the 4th and 5th centuries AD, following the Byzantine–Persian partition of Armenia in 387, Tao came under Persian influence, and its western border (Iberian gates) served as aboundary between the two empires. Tao or Tayk was one of the nine districts forming the territory of the Armenian kingdom of Arshak III. Tao at that period was a principality, the ancestral domain of the Mamikonid clan. In the 6th century, the Byzantines took control over Tao. Once the Mamikonians had disappeared from the scene, the Bagratids began their ascendancy.

Middle Ages 
Medieval Georgian sources recorded the Upper (southwest) Tao and Lower (northwest) Tao, of which the former was in Bagratid possession while the latter was ruled by the Guaramid House. By the late 8th century, The Bagrationi family had grown in prominence by the time the Caucasian Iberia fell to the Sassanid Empire in the 6th century, and the leading local princely families were exhausted by Arab attacks. The rise of the new dynasty was made possible by the extinction of the Guaramids and the near-extinction of the Chosroids, and also by the Abbasid preoccupation with their own civil wars and conflict with the Byzantine Empire.

Princedom 
The new era began in Tao-Klarjeti in 813, when the last Iberian prince Ashot I of the Bagrationi dynasty moved to Klarjeti and made it a base in his struggle against the Arab occupation. Recognizing the Byzantine suzerainty, he received a title of Curopalate (Greek: κουροπαλάτης) and established the Kouropalatate of Iberia. The Bagrationi family eventually took control of both Upper and Lower Tao and gradually expanded its sphere of influence. He encouraged resettlement of Georgians in these lands, and patronized monastic life initiated by the prominent Georgian ecclesiastic figure Grigol Khandzta (c. 759–861). For a long time the region became a cultural safe-house and one of the most important religious centers of Georgia.

Rulers of Tao 

 In the second half of the 10th century, Tao became a large and powerful principality during the rule of David III of Tao. The growth and consolidation of this principality contributed to the expansion of Georgian cultural and economic ties with other kingdoms and principalities. The might of the principality was clearly demonstrated in 979, when Byzantine Emperor Basil II, facing a large rebellion of Bardas Scleros (976–979), appealed for help to David III. Georgian expeditionary corps under the John Tornikios defeated the insurgents and restored the emperor's authority. Throughout his reign, David Curopalates pursued his grand design of the unification of Georgia. Supported by Ioane Marushisdze, the powerful duke of Iberia (Kartli), he succeeded in having his adopted son Bagrat placed on the throne of Kartli in 975 and of Abkhazia in 978.

Following David III's death in 1001, his domain was inherited by emperor of Byzantine Basil II, these provinces were organized into the theme of Iberia with the capital at Theodosiopolis, forcing the successor Georgian Bagratid ruler Bagrat III to recognize the new rearrangement. Bagrat's son, George I, however, inherited a longstanding claim to David's succession. Young and ambitious, George launched a campaign to restore the Kuropalates’ succession to Georgia and occupied Tao in 1015–1016. Byzantines were at that time involved in a relentless war with the Bulgarian Empire, limiting their actions to the west. But as soon as Bulgaria was conquered, Basil II led his army against Georgia (1021). An exhausting war lasted for two years, and ended in a decisive Byzantine victory, forcing George to agree to a peace treaty, in which he had to abandon his claims to Tao.

After the Battle of Manzikert in 1071 the Seljuk advance forced the Byzantines to evacuate the eastern Anatolia, in 1072-1073 the Georgian governor of theme of Iberia, Gregory Pakourianos ceded control over Tao to King George II of Georgia. Over the next five centuries, Tao was an integral part of the Kingdom of Georgia. The medieval House of Panaskerteli, who derived their name from the castle of Panaskerti came into prominence with Zakaria of Panaskerti, who together with some other nobles, put down in 1192 the revolt against Queen Tamar of Georgia and were eventually enfeoffed with the duchy of Tao. His descendant, T'aqa Panaskerteli, Duke of Tao, defeated the Turkomans invading Georgia in about 1302 at Tortomi Castle. Tao was later placed within principality of Samtskhe, ruled by the House of Jaqeli.

Modern history 
In 1545 region was conquered by the Ottoman Empire, which retained it for the centuries. After the Russian annexation of Georgia in 1801, the region was contested between Russia and the Ottoman Empire in a series of wars throughout the 18th and 19th centuries. After the Russo-Turkish War of 1877–1878, one part of Tao, now designated as Yusufeli and Oltu districts, were ceded to the Russian Empire and incorporated into Batum and Kars Oblast, while most part of historical Tao were secured by Ottomans, as part of Erzurum Vilayet. However, the Russian territorial gains in Tao were reversed in the Treaty of Brest-Litovsk between Ottoman Turkey and Bolshevik Russia in 1918. Although the Democratic Republic of Georgia briefly regained its control of the region in 1919–1920, the subsequent invasion of the Red Army in 1921 led to the territorial partition of Georgia in which Turkey received the provinces of Tao and Klarjeti. 

Today Tao is within the boundary of modern-day Turkey. Armenian residents were largely forced out of the region during the early 20th century, but the Georgian populace remains. More importantly, the region contains numerous Georgian historical monuments, notably the churches and monasteries of Ishkhani, Bana, Doliskana, Parkhali, Kakhuli, Oshki, Otkhta and others. Recent study has found most of the surviving monuments in satisfactory condition, but some have been vandalized, and immediate conservation and renovation is urgently needed.

See also
Tao-Klarjeti
Klarjeti
Tayk

External links
"Georgia" in Encyclopædia Britannica Online

References 

Geography of Turkey
Tao-Klarjeti
Bagratid Iberia
Former provinces of Georgia (country)
Historical regions of Georgia (country)
Historical regions in Turkey
Regions of Asia
Geography of the Middle East
History of Western Asia
Historical regions